Garrison Tower is a Grade II listed structure on St Mary's, Isles of Scilly

The tower was built in the 17th century as a windmill. By 1750 it was abandoned and in a ruined condition. The remains were converted to a lookout tower in the 1830s by HM Coastguard.

In 1869, the Shipping and Mercantile Gazette obtained it as a lookout post to report shipping movements. It was taken over by Lloyd's of London in 1871.

References

Buildings and structures in the Isles of Scilly
Grade II listed buildings in Cornwall
St Mary's, Isles of Scilly